S. Dhamodharan was an Indian politician and former Member of the Legislative Assembly. He was elected to the Tamil Nadu legislative assembly as a Tamil Maanila Congress (Moopanar) candidate from Virudhunagar constituency in 2001 election.

References 

Possibly living people
Year of birth missing
Tamil Nadu politicians
Tamil Maanila Congress politicians